Gekko phuyenensis is a species of gecko. It is found in Phú Yên Province, Vietnam.

References 

Gekko
Reptiles described in 2021